Power over Ethernet, or PoE, describes any of several standards or ad hoc systems that pass electric power along with data on twisted-pair Ethernet cabling. This allows a single cable to provide both a data connection and enough electricity to power devices such as wireless access points (WAPs), Internet Protocol (IP) cameras and voice over Internet Protocol (VoIP) phones.

There are several common techniques for transmitting power over Ethernet cabling. Three of them have been standardized by Institute of Electrical and Electronics Engineers (IEEE) standard IEEE 802.3 since 2003.  These standards are known as alternative A, alternative B, and 4PPoE. For 10BASE-T and 100BASE-TX, only two of the four signal pairs in typical Cat 5 cable are used.  Alternative B separates the data and the power conductors, making troubleshooting easier.  It also makes full use of all four twisted pairs in a typical Cat 5 cable. The positive voltage is applied to pins 4 and 5, and the negative to pins 7 and 8.

Alternative A transports power on the same wires as data for 10 and 100 Mbit/s Ethernet variants.  This is similar to the phantom power technique commonly used for powering condenser microphones. Power is transmitted on the data conductors by applying a common voltage to each pair. Because twisted-pair Ethernet uses differential signaling, this does not interfere with data transmission. The common-mode voltage is easily extracted using the center tap of the standard Ethernet pulse transformer. For Gigabit Ethernet and faster, both alternatives A and B transport power on wire pairs also used for data since all four pairs are used for data transmission at these speeds.

4PPoE provides power using all four pairs of a twisted-pair cable. This enables higher power for applications like pan–tilt–zoom cameras (PTZ), high-performance WAPs, or even charging laptop batteries.

In addition to standardizing existing practice for spare-pair (Alternative B), common-mode data pair power (Alternative A) and 4-pair transmission (4PPoE), the IEEE PoE standards provide for signaling between the power sourcing equipment (PSE) and powered device (PD). This signaling allows the presence of a conformant device to be detected by the power source, and allows the device and source to negotiate the amount of power required or available.

Standards development

Two- and four-pair Ethernet
The original IEEE 802.3af-2003 PoE standard provides up to 15.4 W of DC power (minimum  and 350 mA) on each port. Only 12.95 W is assured to be available at the powered device as some power dissipates in the cable. The updated IEEE 802.3at-2009 PoE standard also known as PoE+ or PoE plus, provides up to 25.5 W of power for Type 2 devices. The 2009 standard prohibits a powered device from using all four pairs for power. Both of these standards have since been incorporated into the IEEE 802.3-2012 publication.

The IEEE 802.3bt-2018 standard further expands the power capabilities of 802.3at. It is also known as PoE++ or 4PPoE. The standard introduces two additional power types: up to 51 W delivered power (Type 3) and up to 71.3 W delivered power (Type 4). Each pair of twisted pairs needs to handle a current of up to 600 mA (Type 3) or 960 mA (Type 4). Additionally, support for 2.5GBASE-T, 5GBASE-T and 10GBASE-T is included. This development opens the door to new applications and expands the use of applications such as high-performance wireless access points and surveillance cameras.

Single-pair Ethernet
The IEEE 802.3bu-2016 amendment introduced single-pair Power over Data Lines for the single-pair Ethernet standards 100BASE-T1 and 1000BASE-T1 intended for automotive and industrial applications. On the two-pair or four-pair standards, the same power voltage is applied to each conductor of the pair, so that within each pair there is no differential voltage other than that representing the transmitted data. With single-pair Ethernet, power is transmitted in parallel to the data. PoDL initially defined ten power classes, ranging from 0.5 to 50 W (at PD).

Subsequently, PoDL was added to the single-pair variants 10BASE-T1, 2.5GBASE-T1, 5GBASE-T1, and 10GBASE-T1 and  includes a total of 15 power classes with additional intermediate voltage and power levels.

Uses

Examples of devices powered by PoE include:
 VoIP phones
 IP cameras including PTZs
 WAPs
 IP TV (IPTV) decoders
 Network routers
 A mini network switch installed in distant rooms, to support a small cluster of Ethernet ports from one uplink cable. PoE power is fed into the PD (or PoE in) port. These switches may in turn power remote PoE devices using PoE pass through.
 Intercom and public address systems and hallway speaker amplifiers
 Wall clocks in rooms and hallways, with time set using Network Time Protocol (NTP)
 Outdoor roof mounted radios with integrated antennas, 4G/LTE, 802.11 or 802.16 based wireless CPEs (customer premises equipment) used by wireless ISPs
 Outdoor point to point microwave and millimeter wave radios and some Free Space Optics (FSO) units usually featuring proprietary PoE
 Industrial control system components including sensors, controllers, meters etc.
 Access control components including help-points, intercoms, entry cards, keyless entry, etc.
 Intelligent lighting controllers and Light-Emitting Diode (LED) Lighting fixtures
 Stage and Theatrical devices, such as networked audio breakout and routing boxes
 Remote Point Of Sale (POS) kiosks
 Inline Ethernet extenders
 PoE Splitters that output the power, often at a different voltage (e.g. 5V), to power a remote device or charge a mobile phone

Terminology

Power sourcing equipment
Power sourcing equipment (PSE) are devices that provide (source) power on the Ethernet cable. This device may be a network switch, commonly called an endspan (IEEE 802.3af refers to it as endpoint), or an intermediary device between a non-PoE-capable switch and a PoE device, an external PoE injector, called a midspan device.

Powered device
A powered device (PD) is any device powered by PoE, thus consuming energy. Examples include wireless access points, VoIP phones, and IP cameras.

Many powered devices have an auxiliary power connector for an optional external power supply. Depending on the design, some, none, or all of the device's power can be supplied from the auxiliary port, with the auxiliary port also sometimes acting as backup power in case PoE-supplied power fails.

Power management features and integration

Advocates of PoE expect PoE to become a global long term DC power cabling standard and replace a multiplicity of individual AC adapters, which cannot be easily centrally managed. Critics of this approach argue that PoE is inherently less efficient than AC power due to the lower voltage, and this is made worse by the thin conductors of Ethernet. Advocates of PoE, like the Ethernet Alliance, point out that quoted losses are for worst case scenarios in terms of cable quality, length and power consumption by powered devices. In any case, where the central PoE supply replaces several dedicated AC circuits, transformers and inverters, the power loss in cabling can be justifiable.

Integrating EEE and PoE
The integration of PoE with the IEEE 802.3az Energy-Efficient Ethernet (EEE) standard potentially produces additional energy savings. Pre-standard integrations of EEE and PoE (such as Marvell's EEPoE outlined in a May 2011 white paper) claim to achieve a savings upwards of 3 W per link. This saving is especially significant as higher power devices come online.

Standard implementation
Standards-based Power over Ethernet is implemented following the specifications in IEEE 802.3af-2003 (which was later incorporated as clause 33 into IEEE 802.3-2005) or the 2009 update, IEEE 802.3at. The standards require category 5 cable or better for high power levels but allow using category 3 cable if less power is required.

Power is supplied as a common-mode signal over two or more of the differential pairs of wires found in the Ethernet cables and comes from a power supply within a PoE-enabled networking device such as an Ethernet switch or can be injected into a cable run with a midspan power supply, an additional PoE power source that can be used in combination with a non-PoE switch.

A phantom power technique is used to allow the powered pairs to also carry data.  This permits its use not only with 10BASE-T and 100BASE-TX, which use only two of the four pairs in the cable, but also with 1000BASE-T (gigabit Ethernet), 2.5GBASE-T, 5GBASE-T, and 10GBASE-T which use all four pairs for data transmission.  This is possible because all versions of Ethernet over twisted pair cable specify differential data transmission over each pair with transformer coupling; the DC supply and load connections can be made to the transformer center-taps at each end. Each pair thus operates in common mode as one side of the DC supply, so two pairs are required to complete the circuit. The polarity of the DC supply may be inverted by crossover cables; the powered device must operate with either pair: spare pairs 4–5 and 7–8 or data pairs 1–2 and 3–6. Polarity is defined by the standards on spare pairs, and ambiguously implemented for data pairs, with the use of a diode bridge.

Notes:

Powering devices
Three modes, A, B, and 4-pair are available. Mode A delivers power on the data pairs of 100BASE-TX or 10BASE-T. Mode B delivers power on the spare pairs. 4-pair delivers power on all four pairs. PoE can also be used on 1000BASE-T, 2.5GBASE-T, 5GBASE-T and 10GBASE-T Ethernet, in which case there are no spare pairs and all power is delivered using the phantom technique.

Mode A has two alternate configurations (MDI and MDI-X), using the same pairs but with different polarities. In mode A, pins 1 and 2 (pair #2 in T568B wiring) form one side of the 48 V DC, and pins 3 and 6 (pair #3 in T568B) form the other side. These are the same two pairs used for data transmission in 10BASE-T and 100BASE-TX, allowing the provision of both power and data over only two pairs in such networks. The free polarity allows PoE to accommodate for crossover cables, patch cables and Auto MDI-X.

In mode B, pins 4–5 (pair #1 in both T568A and T568B) form one side of the DC supply and pins 7–8 (pair #4 in both T568A and T568B) provide the return; these are the "spare" pairs in 10BASE-T and 100BASE-TX. Mode B, therefore, requires a 4-pair cable.

The PSE, not the PD, decides whether power mode A or B shall be used. PDs that implement only mode A or mode B are disallowed by the standard. The PSE can implement mode A or B or both. A PD indicates that it is standards-compliant by placing a 25 kΩ resistor between the powered pairs. If the PSE detects a resistance that is too high or too low (including a short circuit), no power is applied. This protects devices that do not support PoE. An optional power class feature allows the PD to indicate its power requirements by changing the sense resistance at higher voltages.

To retain power, the PD must use at least 5–10 mA for at least 60 ms at a time. If the PD goes more than 400 ms without meeting this requirement, the PSE will consider the device disconnected and, for safety reasons, remove power.

There are two types of PSEs: endspans and midspans. Endspans (commonly called PoE switches) are Ethernet switches that include the power over Ethernet transmission circuitry. Midspans are power injectors that stand between a regular Ethernet switch and the powered device, injecting power without affecting the data. Endspans are normally used on new installations or when the switch has to be replaced for other reasons (such as moving from 10/100 Mbit/s to 1 Gbit/s), which makes it convenient to add the PoE capability. Midspans are used when there is no desire to replace and configure a new Ethernet switch, and only PoE needs to be added to the network.

IEEE 802.3at capable devices are also referred to as Type 2. An 802.3at PSE may also use LLDP communication to signal 802.3at capability.

Class 4 can only be used by IEEE 802.3at (Type 2) devices, requiring valid Class 2 and Mark 2 currents for the power up stages. An 802.3af device presenting a class 4 current is considered non-compliant and, instead, will be treated as a Class 0 device.

Configuration via Ethernet layer 2 LLDP
Link Layer Discovery Protocol (LLDP) is a layer-2 Ethernet protocol for managing devices. LLDP allows an exchange of information between a PSE and a PD. This information is formatted in type–length–value (TLV) format. PoE standards define TLV structures used by PSEs and PDs to signal and negotiate available power.

The setup phases are as follows:
 PSE (provider) tests PD (consumer) physically using 802.3af phase class 3.
 PSE powers up PD.
 PD sends to PSE: I'm a PD, max power = X, max power requested = X.
 PSE sends to PD: I'm a PSE, max power allowed = X.
 PD may now use the amount of power as specified by the PSE.

The rules for this power negotiation are:
 PD shall never request more power than physical 802.3af class
 PD shall never draw more than max power advertised by PSE
 PSE may deny any PD drawing more power than max allowed by PSE
 PSE shall not reduce power allocated to PD that is in use
 PSE may request reduced power, via conservation mode

Non-standard implementations

Cisco
Some Cisco WLAN access points and VoIP phones supported a proprietary form of PoE many years before there was an IEEE standard for delivering PoE. Cisco's original PoE implementation is not software upgradeable to the IEEE 802.3af standard. The amount of power to be delivered is negotiated between the endpoint and the Cisco switch based on a power value that was added to the Cisco proprietary Cisco Discovery Protocol (CDP). CDP is also responsible for dynamically communicating the Voice VLAN value from the Cisco switch to the Cisco VoIP Phone.

Under Cisco's pre-standard scheme, the PSE (switch) will send a fast link pulse (FLP) on the transmit pair. The PD (device) connects the transmit line to the receive line via a low-pass filter. The PSE gets the FLP in return. The PD must then provide Ethernet link within  to the auto-negotiation mode switch port. A later CDP message with a TLV tells the PSE its final power requirement. A discontinuation of link pulses shuts down power.

In 2014, Cisco created another non-standard PoE implementation called  (UPOE). UPOE can use all 4 pairs, after negotiation, to supply up to 60 W.

Linear Technology
A proprietary high-power development called LTPoE++, using a single Cat 5e Ethernet cable, is capable of supplying varying levels at 38.7, 52.7, 70, and 90 W.

Microsemi
PowerDsine, acquired by Microsemi in 2007, has been selling midspan power injectors since 1999 with its proprietary Power over LAN solution. Several companies such as Polycom, 3Com, Lucent and Nortel utilize PowerDsine's Power over LAN.

Passive
In a passive PoE system, the injector does not communicate with the powered device to negotiate its voltage or wattage requirements, but merely supplies power at all times. Common 100 Mbit/s passive applications use the pinout of 802.3af mode B (see )with DC positive on pins 4 and 5 and DC negative on 7 and 8 and data on 1–2 and 3–6, but polarization may vary. Gigabit passive injectors use a transformer on the data pins to allow power and data to share the cable and are typically compatible with 802.3af Mode A. Passive midspan injectors with up to 12 ports are available.

Devices needing 5 volts cannot typically use PoE at 5 V on Ethernet cable beyond short distances (about ) as the voltage drop of the cable becomes too significant, so a 24 V or 48 V to 5 V DC-DC converter is required at the remote end.

Passive PoE power sources are commonly used with a variety of indoor and outdoor wireless radio equipment, most commonly from Motorola (now Cambium), Ubiquiti Networks, MikroTik and others. Earlier versions of passive PoE 24 VDC power sources shipped with 802.11a, 802.11g and 802.11n based radios are commonly 100 Mbit/s only.

Passive DC-to-DC injectors also exist which convert a 9 V to 36 V DC, or 36 V to 72 V DC power source to a stabilized 24 V 1 A, 48 V 0.5 A, or up to 48 V 2.0 A PoE feed with '+' on pins 4 & 5 and '−' on pins 7 & 8. These DC-to-DC PoE injectors are used in various telecom applications.

Power capacity limits
The ISO/IEC TR 29125 and Cenelec EN 50174-99-1 draft standards outline the cable bundle temperature rise that can be expected from the use of 4PPoE. A distinction is made between two scenarios: 
 bundles heating up from the inside to the outside, and 
 bundles heating up from the outside to match the ambient temperature. 
The second scenario largely depends on the environment and installation, whereas the first is solely influenced by the cable construction. In a standard unshielded cable, the PoE-related temperature rise increases by a factor of 5. In a shielded cable, this value drops to between 2.5 and 3, depending on the design.

Pinouts

References

External links
 Buy the IEEE 802.3 standards
 ieee802.org: IEEE 802.3af Task Force
 ieee802.org: IEEE 802.3at Task Force
 ieee802.org: IEEE 802.3bt Task Force

Ethernet
Networking hardware
Network appliances
Electric power
IEEE standards
Power supplies